The 33rd Biathlon World Championships held in March 1998 in Pokljuka, Slovenia, and for the second time in Hochfilzen, Austria were only for the pursuit races (Pokljuka) and the team events (Hochfilzen) because these were not part of the Olympic programme in Nagano.

Men's results

12.5 km pursuit

Team event

Women's results

10 km pursuit

Team event

Medal table

References

1998
World Championships
International sports competitions hosted by Austria
1998 in Austrian sport
International sports competitions hosted by Slovenia
1998 in Slovenian sport
Sport in Tyrol (state)
Biathlon competitions in Austria
Biathlon competitions in Slovenia
March 1998 sports events in Europe